Dane Dorahy, also known by the nickname of "Doz", is an Australian former professional rugby league footballer who played in the 1990s and 2000s. He is the son of former international player and coach, John Dorahy.

References

Sources

External links
2001 Super League Team-by-team guide

1977 births
Living people
Australian rugby league players
Halifax R.L.F.C. players
Hull Kingston Rovers players
Place of birth missing (living people)
Rochdale Hornets players
Rugby league five-eighths
Rugby league fullbacks
Rugby league halfbacks
Wakefield Trinity players
Western Suburbs Magpies players
Western Suburbs Magpies NSW Cup players